Charles Duff (7 April 1894 – 15 October 1966) was a Northern Irish writer of books on language learning. He also wrote a popular book on hanging and other means of execution.

Early life
Duff was born in Enniskillen, County Fermanagh, Ireland and attended Portora Royal School (now Enniskillen Royal Grammar School), which is located in the town.

Career
Duff served as an officer in the British Merchant Navy in World War I and then in the intelligence division of the Foreign Office and Her Majesty's Diplomatic Service. He resigned from the Foreign Office in the 1930s, claiming it was solidly supportive of fascism in Spain and ready to back a similar system in Britain.

Languages
After he retired, Duff taught linguistics and languages in London and Singapore, while writing travel guides, histories, satires, and a series of text books for the active self-learner. He was fluent in seven languages. His many translations included works by Francisco de Quevedo, Émile Zola, B. Traven, Maxim Gorky, and Arnold Zweig.

Duff's best known book is A Handbook of Hanging. This also covers electrocution, decapitations, gassings, innocent men executed and botched executions. It has been reissued intermittently in the UK, for instance in 1948, 1953, 1954, 1974, etc., and in the United States in 1999, with an introduction by Christopher Hitchens.

Duff's book James Joyce and the Plain Reader (1932) is an introduction James Joyce's major works that seeks to guide "the plain reader" through the author's oeuvre. Duff both situates Joyce within a long literary tradition and emphasises his originality. In describing Joyce, Duff draws on ethnic stereotypes, describing Irish people as motivated by "a restless and often fantastic imagination". Joyce himself owned a copy of Duff's book, and the literary scholar Jean-Michel Rabaté argues that, when Joyce came to complete Finnegans Wake (1939), he was pleased with Duff's book and incorporated elements of Duff's thought into his work, including the vindication of the rights of the "plain reader". George Orwell, in a 1933 letter to Eleanor Jacques, described James Joyce and the Plain Reader as "weak trash, which would give the impression that J[oyce] was a writer on the [Hugh] Walpole—[J. B.] Priestley level."

Works

Notes

External links
Information on Duff at LanguageHat.com 
Library Thing Web site, page on Charles Duff books

English non-fiction writers
Linguists from the United Kingdom
1894 births
1966 deaths
English male non-fiction writers
20th-century linguists
James Joyce scholars